Rockingham City FC is an association football club based in Rockingham, Western Australia established in 1970. Based at the Lark Hill Sports Complex which they moved to in 2008. Rockingham City also hosts junior teams starting at Under 6's, senior amateur and women's teams. The club will compete in 2022 in the Football West State League Division 1.

History

Originally based at the Rockingham City park oval, the team moved to the then new venue of Dowling Street in the mid to late 1970s. They moved to their current home field at the Lark Hill Sports Complex in 2008.

Current squad

Honours
First Division winners : 1976, 2018

Second Division winners : 1973, 1983

Green And Gold Charity Cup Winners : 2020

Notable past players
Notable former players (in the senior team or the veterans teams) include Ernie Hannigan (ex Queen of the South and Coventry City) and Billy Hulston (East Stirlingshire – Sir Alex Ferguson's first signing). The first professional player signed by Rockingham City in 1970 was Gerard Docherty who has since returned to live in Paisley, Scotland.

References

Rockingham City Football Club Website

External links
 

Soccer clubs in Perth, Western Australia
Football West State League teams
Association football clubs established in 1970
1970 establishments in Australia
Sporting clubs in Rockingham, Western Australia